Koor may refer to:
 Koor, Indonesia, a village in West Papua, Indonesia
 Koor, Rajasthan, a village in India
 KOOR, an American radio station
Koor, Camel Bell

See also 
 Coor (disambiguation)
 Koore (disambiguation)
 Kur (disambiguation)